Nana is a Japanese manga series written and illustrated by Ai Yazawa that was adapted into an anime television series in 2006, with 47 episodes total.

All vocal songs featured in the show were performed by Anna Tsuchiya, who provided Nana Osaki's singing voice, and Olivia Lufkin, who provided Reira Serizawa's singing voice. They were credited as "Anna Tsuchiya inspi' Nana (Black Stones)" and "Olivia inspi' Reira (Trapnest)" respectively. The opening theme songs are "Rose" by Tsuchiya (episodes 1–21.5), "Wish" by Lufkin (episodes 22–36.5), and "Lucy" by Tsuchiya (episodes 37–47). The ending theme songs are "A Little Pain" by Lufkin (episodes 1–17), "Starless Night" by Lufkin (episodes 18–29, 40–42), "Kuroi Namida" by Tsuchiya (episodes 30–39, 47), "Winter Sleep" by Lufkin (episodes 43 and 44) and "Stand by Me" by Tsuchiya (episodes 45 and 46). 

The first episode aired to a 6.2% audience share in Japan.

The series has been licensed for a North American release by Viz Media, which they first announced at San Diego Comic-Con International 2007. The series was first available in North America on the Funimation Channel. A dubbed version was later added to iTunes. The first eleven episodes were released subtitled on Hulu prior to a DVD release. The first English DVD box set was released on September 8, 2009; the second on November 24, 2009.

Episodes

References

Nana